Gustaaf Hermans (born 12 May 1951) is a former Belgian cyclist. He competed in the individual road race and team time trial events at the 1972 Summer Olympics.

References

External links
 

1951 births
Living people
Belgian male cyclists
Olympic cyclists of Belgium
Cyclists at the 1972 Summer Olympics
UCI Road World Champions (elite men)
Cyclists from Flemish Brabant
People from Rotselaar